is a former Japanese football player.

Playing career
Hyakutake was born in Kawatana, Nagasaki on November 21, 1977. After graduating from high school, he joined the J1 League club Cerezo Osaka in 1996. He played in many matches as a left side back and defensive midfielder. In 1999, he moved to the Japan Football League club Denso. He retired at the end of the 2000 season.

Club statistics

References

External links

1977 births
Living people
Association football people from Nagasaki Prefecture
Japanese footballers
J1 League players
Japan Football League players
Cerezo Osaka players
FC Kariya players
Association football defenders